The Grand Tours are the three most prestigious multi-week stage races in professional road bicycle racing. The competitions are the Giro d'Italia, Tour de France and Vuelta a España, contested annually in that order. They are the only stage races permitted to last longer than 14 days. No cyclist has won all three Grand Tours's points classifications in the same year; the only cyclists to win all three Grand Tours's points classifications in their career are Djamolidine Abdoujaparov, Mark Cavendish, Laurent Jalabert, Eddy Merckx and Alessandro Petacchi. It is rare for cyclists to ride all Grand Tours in the same year; in 2004, 474 cyclists started in one of the Grand Tours, 68 rode two and two cyclists started all three.

Cyclists are ranked on the basis of their total wins in the three Grand Tours. When there is a tie between cyclists they are listed alphabetically by the Grand Tour they won. The majority of winners have come from Europe, however there have been a few notable victories for cyclists from other continents. Abdoujaparov, of Uzbekistan, won five points classifications. The only other non-European country to win a points classification at a Grand Tour is Australia, who have won five between three riders.

Erik Zabel, with 9 victories, has won the most points classifications at the Grand Tours. Sean Kelly is second with 8 and Laurent Jalabert is third with seven. Zabel held the record for the most points classifications at the Tour with six, until being surpassed by Peter Sagan in 2019. Francesco Moser and Giuseppe Saronni share the record of four points classifications at the Giro. While, Kelly and Jalabert both have four victories in the points classification at the Vuelta.

Winners

By cyclist
Riders in bold are still active. Number of wins in gold indicates the current record holder(s).

By country

See also 
 Cycling sprinter
 Points classification in the Tour de France
 Points classification in the Giro d'Italia
 Points classification in the Vuelta a España

References

General

Specific

Lists of cyclists
Grand Tour (cycling)